Sir John Gilbert  (21 July 1817 – 5 October 1897) was an English artist, illustrator and engraver.

Biography
Gilbert was born in Blackheath, Surrey, and taught himself to paint. His only formal instruction was from George Lance. Skilled in several media, Gilbert gained the nickname, "the Scott of painting". He was best known for the illustrations and wood-engravings he produced for the Illustrated London News. 

Gilbert was initially apprenticed to a firm of estate agents, but taught himself art by copying prints. He was unable to enter the Royal Academy Schools, but mastered watercolour, oils, and other media. From 1836 he exhibited at the Society of British Artists, and at the RA from 1838. The art patron Thomas Sheepshanks and the artist William Mulready suggested that he learn wood engraving. Starting with Punch, he moved on to the Illustrated London News. He designed an impressive number of wood-engravings (over 2000) for that publication and for The London Journal. He also produced very many illustrations for books, including nearly all the important English poets (including his illustrated Shakespeare with almost 750 drawings). He became president of the Royal Watercolour Society in 1871. He exhibited some 400 pictures in watercolour and oil exhibited at the various societies. In 1872 he was knighted. He became an RA in 1876, in the same year as Edward John Poynter.

The Gilbert-Garret Competition for Sketching Clubs was started in 1870 at St. Martins School of Art, and named after its first president, John Gilbert.

Gilbert is buried at Brockley and Ladywell Cemeteries.

Illustrated books and legacy
Gilbert illustrated:
 William Shakespeare. Song and sonnets (London: S. Low, Marston, Searle, & Rivington, 1862).
 Tales from Shakspeare. Charles Lamb (London: Richard Clay & Sons, Bread Street Hill, 1866)
Shaksperes Works Charles Knight – Illustrations by Sir John Gilbert R.A (date unknown)

Gilbert has nearly sixty oil paintings in British national collections.

References

External links

Phryne's list of paintings by Gilbert in accessible UK collections
Gilbert biography with full text of obituary
 
 
 
 Profile on Royal Academy of Arts Collections

People from Blackheath, London
19th-century English painters
English male painters
English illustrators
English watercolourists
1817 births
1897 deaths
Royal Academicians
Burials at Brockley and Ladywell Cemeteries
19th-century English male artists